Durga Bari is a residential-cum commercial neighborhood under the Civil Lines thana jurisdiction of Gaya, Bihar, India. It is located south of Dulhingunj neighborhood while facing Falgu River eastwards. The area is known for serving several Hindu temples dedicated to goddess Durga and usually gets crowded during the annual Durga Puja celebrations.

References 

Gaya, India
Bihar